Braddocks Run is a  long 2nd order tributary to the Youghiogheny River in Somerset County, Pennsylvania.

Variant names
According to the Geographic Names Information System, it has also been known historically as:
Braddock Run

Course
Braddocks Run rises about 1 mile south of Addison, Pennsylvania, and then flows northwest to join the Youghiogheny River in Youghiogheny River Lake about 0.25 miles south of Somerfield.

Watershed
Braddocks Run drains  of area, receives about 45.7 in/year of precipitation, has a wetness index of 367.96, and is about 62% forested.

See also
List of rivers of Pennsylvania

References

Tributaries of the Youghiogheny River
Rivers of Pennsylvania
Rivers of Somerset County, Pennsylvania